Habibul is a Bengali name. Notable people with the name include:
Habibul Ahsan, Bangladeshi epidemiologist
Mohammad Habibul Alam, Bangladeshi politician
Habibul Bashar (born 1972), Bangladeshi cricketer
Habibul Islam Habib, Bangladeshi politician
Syed Habibul Haque, Bangladeshi politician

Bangladeshi masculine given names